HMC Vigilant is a Border Agency (customs) cutter of the United Kingdom.  She was launched by Damen Shipyards in the Netherlands in 2003 and is one of four  cutters operated by the UK Border Force.

History
Vigilant entered service for the British Government by the then HM Customs and Excise in 2004. In 2008, the fleet of customs cutters was transferred, along with border control duties, from HM Revenue and Customs to the newly formed UK Border Agency. She now operates as part of the UK Border Agency fleet of five cutters.

Prefix
The Inland Revenue and HM Customs and Excise Departments merged to form HM Revenue and Customs on 18 April 2005, and from this time customs cutters changed their prefix from "HMRC" (Her Majesty's Revenue Cutter) to "HMCC" (Her Majesty's Customs Cutter). Following transfer to the UK Border Agency this was shortened to the current "HMC" (Her Majesty's Cutter) and a new livery applied to the fleet of cutters.

Construction

Vigilant is the third of the Customs and Excise's fleet of  customs patrol vessels.  She was built in 2003 in the Damen Shipyards in the Netherlands, and has a steel hull with an aluminium superstructure. Much effort has been expended in making her quiet to reduce crew fatigue; the engines are raft-mounted, decks throughout the ship are of a floating type, and the compartments are constructed on a box-within-a-box principle.

The  Rigid Inflatable Boat can be launched from her stern slipway.

Propulsion
Vigilant is fitted with twin Caterpillar 3516B DI-TA Elec engines driving twin 4-bladed controllable-pitch propellers through a pair of 3.5:1 reduction gearboxes. A single Promac bow thruster is installed for slow speed manoeuvring in confined spaces. Electrical power is supplied by two 106kWA generators.

References

Ships built in Vlissingen
Ships of the United Kingdom
2003 ships
Customs cutters of the United Kingdom